Anton Volodymyrovich Shekhovtsov (born 1978) is a Ukrainian political scientist, academic and writer. He is known for his writings on the European radical right and in particular its connections to Russia. He is the editor of the Explorations of the Far Right book series at ibidem-Verlag and sits on the board of the open source Fascism: Journal of Comparative Fascist Studies.

Background
Shekhovtsov was born in 1978 in Sevastopol, then in the Ukrainian Soviet Socialist Republic, Soviet Union. He studied English philology at the Sevastopol National Technical University between 1995 and 2000, going on to teach business English at the European University in Kyiv between 2000 until 2002. He returned to his alma mater to complete an aspirantura in Political Science between 2006 and 2009, and lectured there until 2010.

In the United Kingdom

Between 2010 and 2012 Shekhovtsov had two stints as a visiting fellow researcher at the University of Northampton, as part of the Radicalism and New Media Research Group. He then went on to complete a PhD in Slavonic and East European studies at University College London between 2013 and 2017.

Works
Shekhovtsov's works have  been featured on/at OpenDemocracy, the Chatham House, Foreign Affairs, the Carnegie Council for Ethics in International Affairs and the Aspen Institute.

Bibliography
 New Radical Right-Wing Parties in European Democracies: Determinants of Electoral Support (2011)
White Power Music: Scenes of Extreme-Right Cultural Resistance (2012) with Paul Jackson
The Postwar Anglo-American Far Right: A Special Relationship of Hate (2014) with Paul Jackson
 Russia and the Western Far Right: Tango Noir (2017)

See also
 Edward Lucas
 Roger Griffin

References

External links
 Official Website
Official Blog
 Official Blog (to 2018)
 Twitter

1978 births
Living people
21st-century Ukrainian writers
Scholars of nationalism
Historians of fascism
People of the Euromaidan
Academics and writers on far-right extremism
The Moscow Times